Dettinger is a German record producer signed to Germany's Cologne based Kompakt label.

His releases include 1998's Blond 12", 1999's album Intershop (the first single-artist LP on Kompakt), Puma 12" and Totentanz 12", and 2000's album Oasis. 
Dettinger's tracks have appeared on a range on compilations, including Kompakt's Total and Pop Ambient series and Mille Plateaux's Click + Cuts series.
Dettinger has produced remixes for artists such as Pet Shop Boys, Closer Musik and Jürgen Paape.
He has also collaborated with Frank Rumpelt and M.G. Bondino.

Discography

Albums 
 Intershop (1999)
 Oasis (2000)

Singles 
 Blond (1998)
 Puma (1999)
 Totentanz (1999)

Remixes 
 Tocotronic – Jackpot
 Process – Estero Re Re Mix
 Jürgen Paape – So Weit Wie Noch Nie
 Closer Musik – One Two Three No Gravity
 Triola – Ral 7035
 Pet Shop Boys – Gomorrah

External links 
 Dettinger at Discogs
 

Ambient musicians